Nazrul Islam is a Bangladesh Awami League politician and the former Member of Parliament of Mymensingh-3.

Career
Islam was elected to parliament from Mymensingh-3 as a Bangladesh Awami League candidate in 1991.

Death
Islam died in 1992.

References

Awami League politicians
5th Jatiya Sangsad members
1992 deaths